"The White Man's Burden" (1899), by Rudyard Kipling, is a poem about the Philippine–American War (1899–1902) that exhorts the United States to assume colonial control of the Filipino people and their country. Originally written to celebrate the Diamond Jubilee of Queen Victoria (22 June 1897), the jingoistic poem was replaced with the sombre "Recessional" (1897), also a Kipling poem about empire.

In "The White Man's Burden", Kipling encouraged the American annexation and colonisation of the Philippine Islands, a Pacific Ocean archipelago conquered in the three-month Spanish–American War (1898). As an imperialist poet, Kipling exhorts the American reader and listener to take up the enterprise of empire yet warns about the personal costs faced, endured, and paid in building an empire; nonetheless, American imperialists understood the phrase "the white man's burden" to justify imperial conquest as a civilising mission that is ideologically related to the continental expansion philosophy of manifest destiny of the early 19th century.

History 

"The White Man's Burden" was first published in The Times (London) on 4 February 1899, and in The New York Sun on 5 February 1899. On 7 February 1899, during senatorial debate to decide if the US should retain control of the Philippine Islands and the ten million Filipinos conquered from the Spanish Empire, Senator Benjamin Tillman read aloud the first, the fourth, and the fifth stanzas of Kipling's seven-stanza poem as arguments against ratification of the Treaty of Paris, and that the US should formally renounce claim of authority over the Philippine Islands. To that effect, Senator Tillman addressed the matter to President William McKinley:

He quotes, inter alia, stanzas 1, 4, and 5 of "The White Man's Burden", noting:

Senator Tillman was unpersuasive, and the US Congress ratified the Treaty of Paris on 11 February 1899, formally ending the Spanish–American War. After paying a post-war indemnification of twenty million dollars to the Kingdom of Spain, on 11 April 1899, the US established geopolitical hegemony upon islands and peoples in two oceans and in two hemispheres: the Philippine Islands and Guam in the Pacific Ocean, and Cuba and Puerto Rico in the Atlantic Oceans.

Text

Interpretation 

The imperialist interpretation of "The White Man's Burden" (1899) proposes that the white race is morally obliged to civilise the non-white peoples of planet Earth, and to encourage their progress (economic, social, and cultural) through colonialism:

Kipling positively represents imperialism as the moral burden of the white race, who are divinely destined to "civilise" the brutish, non-white Other who inhabits the barbarous parts of the world; to wit, the seventh and eighth lines of the first stanza represent the Filipinos as "new-caught, sullen peoples, half-devil and half-child." Despite the chauvinistic nationalism that supported Western imperialism in the 19th century, public moral opposition to Kipling's racialist misrepresentation of the colonial exploitation of labour in "The White Man's Burden" produced the satirical essay "To the Person Sitting in Darkness" (1901), by Mark Twain, which catalogues the Western military atrocities of revenge committed against the Chinese people for their anti-colonial Boxer Rebellion (1899–1901) against abusive Western businessmen and Christian missionaries.

Kipling politically proffered the poem to New York governor Theodore Roosevelt (r. 1899–1900) to help him persuade anti-imperialist Americans to accept the territorial annexation of the Philippine Islands to the United States. In September 1898, Kipling's literary reputation in the U.S. allowed his promotion of American empire to Governor Roosevelt:

As Victorian imperial poetry, "The White Man's Burden" thematically corresponded to Kipling's belief that the British Empire was the Englishman's "Divine Burden to reign God's Empire on Earth"; and celebrates British colonialism as a mission of civilisation that eventually would benefit the colonised natives. Roosevelt sent the poem to U.S. Senator Henry Cabot Lodge for his opinion and they agreed that it made "good sense from the expansion standpoint" for the American empire. Since the late nineteenth century, "The White Man's Burden" has served the arguments and counter-arguments of supporters and the opponents of imperialism and white supremacy.

Responses 

In the early 20th century, in addition to "To the Person Sitting in Darkness" (1901), Mark Twain's factual satire of the civilising mission that is proposed, justified, and defended in "The White Man's Burden" (1899), contemporary opposition to Kipling's jingoism provoked poetic parodies that expressed anti-imperialist moral outrage, by critically addressing the particulars of white supremacist racism in colonial empires. "The Brown Man's Burden" (February 1899), by the British politician Henry Labouchère; "The Black Man's Burden: A Response to Kipling" (April 1899), by the clergyman H. T. Johnson; and the poem "Take Up the Black Man's Burden", by the educator J. Dallas Bowser.

In the U.S., a Black Man's Burden Association demonstrated to Americans how the colonial mistreatment of Filipino brown people in their Philippine homeland was a cultural extension of the institutional racism of the Jim Crow laws for the legal mistreatment of black Americans in their U.S. homeland. The popular response against Kipling's jingoism for an American Empire to annex the Philippine Islands as a colony impelled the establishment (15 June 1899) of the American Anti-Imperialist League in their political opposition to making colonial subjects of the Filipinos.

In The Poor Man’s Burden (1899), Dr. Howard S. Taylor addressed the negative psycho-social effects of the imperialist ethos upon the working-class people in an empire. In the social perspective of "The Real White Man's Burden" (1902), the reformer Ernest Crosby addresses the moral degradation (coarsening of affect) consequent to the practice of imperialism; and in "The Black Man's Burden" (1903), the British journalist E. D. Morel reported the Belgian imperial atrocities in the Congo Free State (1885–1908), which was an African personal property of King Leopold II of Belgium.

In The Black Man's Burden: The White Man in Africa, from the Fifteenth Century to World War I (1920), E. D. Morel identifies, describes, and explains that the metropole-colony power relations are established through cultural hegemony, which determines the weight of the black man's burden and the weight of the white man's burden in building a colonial empire. "The Black Man's Burden [A Reply to Rudyard Kipling]" (1920), by the social critic Hubert Harrison, described the moral degradation inflicted upon the colonised Black people and the colonist white people. 

In the decolonisation of the developing world, the phrase the white man's burden is synonymous with colonial domination, to illustrate the falsity of the good intentions of Western neo-colonialism towards the non-white peoples of the world. In 1974, President Idi Amin of Uganda sat atop a throne while forcing four white British businessmen to carry him through the streets of Kampala; as the businessmen groaned under the weight of Amin, he joked that this was "the new white man's burden".

See also 
 Orientalism
 Civilizing mission
 Christian mission
 Economic growth
 Faccetta Nera
 Development theory
 Rudyard Kipling bibliography
 "The Gods of the Copybook Headings" (1919), by Rudyard Kipling
 The Tears of the White Man, by Pascal Bruckner
 The Tyranny of Guilt, by Pascal Bruckner
 White savior
 Valladolid debate
 Yellow Peril

Citations

General references 
 A Companion to Victorian Poetry, Alison Chapman; Blackwell, Oxford, 2002.
 Chisholm, Michael (1982). Modern World Development: A Geographical Perspective. Rowman & Littlefield, 1982, .
 Cody, David. "The Growth of the British Empire". The Victorian Web, University Scholars Program, National University of Singapore, November 2000.
 Crosby, Ernest (1902). The Real White Man's Burden. Funk and Wagnalls Company, 32–35.
 Dixon, Thomas (1902). The Leopard's Spots: A Romance of the White Man's Burden—1865–1900.
 Encyclopedia of India. Ed. Stanley Wolpert. Vol. 3. Detroit: Charles Scribner's Sons, 2006, pp. 35–36. 4 vols.
 "Eurocentrism". In Encyclopedia of the Developing World. Ed. Thomas M. Leonard, Taylor & Francis, 2006, .
 Greenblatt, Stephen (ed.). Norton Anthology of English Literature, New York, 2006. .
 Kipling. Fordham University. Full text of the poem.
 Labouchère, Henry (1899). "The Brown Man's Burden".
 Mama, Amina (1995). Beyond the Masks: Race, Gender, and Subjectivity. Routledge, 1995, .

 Miller, Stuart Creighton (1982). Benevolent Assimilation: The American Conquest of the Philippines, 1899–1903. Yale University Press. .
 Murphy, Gretchen (2010). Shadowing the White Man's Burden: U.S. Imperialism and the Problem of the Color Line. NYU Press. 
 Pimentel, Benjamin (26 October 2003). "The Philippines; 'Liberator' Was Really a Colonizer; Bush's Revisionist History". San Francisco Chronicle: D3.
 Sailer, Steve (2001). "What Will Happen in Afghanistan?". United Press International, 26 September 2001.
 The Shining. Jack Nicholson's character Jack uses the phrase to refer to whiskey.
 The Text of the poem
 

1899 in international relations
1899 poems
Anti-black racism
Anti-Filipino sentiment
Anti-indigenous racism
British colonisation in Africa
Eurocentrism
History of the Philippines (1898–1946)
Imperialism
Philippine–American War
Poetry by Rudyard Kipling
Racism in the United Kingdom
Race-related controversies in literature
White supremacy
Works about New Imperialism
Works about white people
Works originally published in American newspapers
Works originally published in McClure's